Douglas Crise is an American film editor.

Biography
Douglas Crise was born May 1, 1961 to Glenn Crise, a retired mail carrier, and Catherine, a homemaker.  The middle child of the family, Crise grew up in Smithton, Pennsylvania.  In 1979, Crise graduated from Yough High School and soon began to work as a meat cutter at Shop 'n Save in Mount Pleasant, Pennsylvania.  Crise graduated from the University of Pittsburgh with a degree in film studies and moved to Los Angeles to find work in the film industry, working for a little while as a movie lot truck driver.  After a short stay in Los Angeles, Crise returned to Pittsburgh for a year before returning to California to work as a film editor.  For months, Crise worked as an unpaid intern, apprentice, and assistant editor for very little money.  Crise eventually worked his way up the film industry working as an assistant editor.  In 1997, Crise worked as an assistant editor on the film Clockwatchers, with lead editor, Stephen Mirrione.  This was the beginning of what would be a long-lasting collaboration between Crise and Mirrione.  Eventually, Crise and Mirrione collaborated as co-editors on Alejandro González Iñárritu's 2006 film, Babel.  For their work on the film, Crise and Mirrione received a nomination for the Academy Award for Best Film Editing, the BAFTA Award for Best Editing, the Online Film Critics Society Award for Best Editing, and the Satellite Award for Best Editing.  In addition to this, Crise and Mirrione won the 2007 ACE Eddie Award for Best Edited Feature Film – Dramatic tying with Thelma Schoonmaker for The Departed, making it only the second tie in ACE Eddie Award history.

Filmography

References

External links

People from Westmoreland County, Pennsylvania
University of Pittsburgh alumni
American film editors
Living people
1961 births